The Manyawar Shri Kanshiram Ji Green Eco Garden (Hindi:मान्यावर श्री कांशीराम जी ग्रीन इको गार्डन) (also known as Eco Gardens Lucknow) are ecological gardens in Lucknow city named after Bahujan Samaj Party founder Kanshi Ram.

Manyawar Kanshiram Smarak Sthal
The Manyawar Kanshiram Smarak Sthal (or Kanshi Ram Memorial) is memorial of BAMCEF, DS4 and Bahujan Samaj Party founder Kanshi Ram situated at VIP Road, Lucknow. This monument has large dome having a diameter of 39.84 metres. Followers of Bahujan-movement usually gather here for Birth and death anniversary of Kanshi Ram.

Baudh Vihar Shanti Upvan
The Baudh Vihar Shanti Upvan situated at VIP Road, Lucknow is a 32.5 acre Vihara, living place for Buddhist Monks (Bhikkhu) and resting, reading and meditating place followers of Buddhism. The place has 18 feet four-faced white-marble statue of Gautama Buddha surrounded by two 28 feet high Bronze fountains. This Vihara has library with Encyclopedia of Buddhism as a place of study. There is also large meditation hall.

References

External links
Manyawar Shri Kanshiram Ji Green (Eco) Garden

Gardens in Lucknow
Dalit monuments